The Southern constituency (No.152) is a Russian legislative constituency in Rostov Oblast. Until 2007 the constituency covered eastern Rostov-on-Don and its suburbs in Aksaysky District and Bataysk. However, after 2015 redistricting it lost Proletarsky District and parts of Aksaysky District to Rostov constituency, Bataysk to Nizhnedonskoy constituency, but it gained Novocherkassk.

Members elected

Election results

1993

|-
! colspan=2 style="background-color:#E9E9E9;text-align:left;vertical-align:top;" |Candidate
! style="background-color:#E9E9E9;text-align:left;vertical-align:top;" |Party
! style="background-color:#E9E9E9;text-align:right;" |Votes
! style="background-color:#E9E9E9;text-align:right;" |%
|-
|style="background-color:"|
|align=left|Alla Amelina
|align=left|Independent
|
|22.79%
|-
|style="background-color:"|
|align=left|Aleksandr Mayboroda
|align=left|Yavlinsky–Boldyrev–Lukin
| -
|9.47%
|-
| colspan="5" style="background-color:#E9E9E9;"|
|- style="font-weight:bold"
| colspan="3" style="text-align:left;" | Total
| 
| 100%
|-
| colspan="5" style="background-color:#E9E9E9;"|
|- style="font-weight:bold"
| colspan="4" |Source:
|
|}

1995

|-
! colspan=2 style="background-color:#E9E9E9;text-align:left;vertical-align:top;" |Candidate
! style="background-color:#E9E9E9;text-align:left;vertical-align:top;" |Party
! style="background-color:#E9E9E9;text-align:right;" |Votes
! style="background-color:#E9E9E9;text-align:right;" |%
|-
|style="background-color:#019CDC"|
|align=left|Sergey Shakhray
|align=left|Party of Russian Unity and Accord
|
|27.91%
|-
|style="background-color:"|
|align=left|Nikolay Kolomeytsev
|align=left|Communist Party
|
|19.67%
|-
|style="background-color:#3A46CE"|
|align=left|Alla Amelina (incumbent)
|align=left|Democratic Choice of Russia – United Democrats
|
|9.19%
|-
|style="background-color:#2C299A"|
|align=left|Viktor Petrov
|align=left|Congress of Russian Communities
|
|4.43%
|-
|style="background-color:#959698"|
|align=left|Vladimir Titarenko
|align=left|Derzhava
|
|3.43%
|-
|style="background-color:#D50000"|
|align=left|Valentin Khmelevsky
|align=left|Communists and Working Russia - for the Soviet Union
|
|3.33%
|-
|style="background-color:"|
|align=left|Valentin Gerbach
|align=left|Independent
|
|3.11%
|-
|style="background-color:#FF4400"|
|align=left|Anatoly Ryzhakov
|align=left|Party of Workers' Self-Government
|
|2.85%
|-
|style="background-color:"|
|align=left|Viktor Gorbatko
|align=left|Power to the People
|
|2.83%
|-
|style="background-color:"|
|align=left|Aleksandr Grinberg
|align=left|Liberal Democratic Party
|
|2.73%
|-
|style="background-color:"|
|align=left|Anatoly Smirnov
|align=left|Independent
|
|2.44%
|-
|style="background-color:"|
|align=left|Vladimir Vukolov
|align=left|Independent
|
|1.71%
|-
|style="background-color:"|
|align=left|Aleksandr Nikolayev
|align=left|Independent
|
|1.21%
|-
|style="background-color:"|
|align=left|Boris Sturov
|align=left|Russian Party
|
|0.67%
|-
|style="background-color:"|
|align=left|Raisa Grishechkina
|align=left|Democratic Alternative
|
|0.59%
|-
|style="background-color:"|
|align=left|Sergey Gorshkov
|align=left|Independent
|
|0.46%
|-
|style="background-color:#192082"|
|align=left|Gennady Eskin
|align=left|Frontier Generation
|
|0.28%
|-
|style="background-color:#000000"|
|colspan=2 |against all
|
|10.21%
|-
| colspan="5" style="background-color:#E9E9E9;"|
|- style="font-weight:bold"
| colspan="3" style="text-align:left;" | Total
| 
| 100%
|-
| colspan="5" style="background-color:#E9E9E9;"|
|- style="font-weight:bold"
| colspan="4" |Source:
|
|}

1997

|-
! colspan=2 style="background-color:#E9E9E9;text-align:left;vertical-align:top;" |Candidate
! style="background-color:#E9E9E9;text-align:left;vertical-align:top;" |Party
! style="background-color:#E9E9E9;text-align:right;" |Votes
! style="background-color:#E9E9E9;text-align:right;" |%
|-
|style="background-color:"|
|align=left|Nikolay Kolomeytsev
|align=left|Communist Party
|
|39.50%
|-
|style="background-color:"|
|align=left|Gennady Melikyan
|align=left|Our Home – Russia
|
|18.75%
|-
|style="background-color:"|
|align=left|Anatoly Stankov
|align=left|Independent
|
|7.63%
|-
|style="background-color:"|
|align=left|Boris Grinberg
|align=left|Independent
|
|4.09%
|-
|style="background-color:"|
|align=left|Sergey Sleptsov
|align=left|Independent
|
|2.90%
|-
|style="background-color:"|
|align=left|Erlen Yemelyanov
|align=left|Memorial
|
|1.58%
|-
|style="background-color:"|
|align=left|Igor Lyubitsky
|align=left|Union Chernobyl
|
|1.55%
|-
|style="background-color:"|
|align=left|Albert Taranenko
|align=left|Independent
|
|1.47%
|-
|style="background-color:"|
|align=left|Vladimir Dek
|align=left|Independent
|
|1.44%
|-
|style="background-color:black"|
|align=left|Aleksandr Ivanov
|align=left|People's National Party
|
|1.28%
|-
|style="background-color:"|
|align=left|Sergey Apatenko
|align=left|Independent
|
|1.19%
|-
|style="background-color:"|
|align=left|Aleksandr Kasyanov
|align=left|Independent
|
|1.07%
|-
|style="background-color:"|
|align=left|Gennady Shupikov
|align=left|Independent
|
|1.02%
|-
|style="background-color:"|
|align=left|Igor Rozhkov
|align=left|Independent
|
|0.99%
|-
|style="background-color:#000000"|
|colspan=2 |against all
|
|10.79%
|-
| colspan="5" style="background-color:#E9E9E9;"|
|- style="font-weight:bold"
| colspan="3" style="text-align:left;" | Total
| 
| 100%
|-
| colspan="5" style="background-color:#E9E9E9;"|
|- style="font-weight:bold"
| colspan="4" |Source:
|
|}

1999

|-
! colspan=2 style="background-color:#E9E9E9;text-align:left;vertical-align:top;" |Candidate
! style="background-color:#E9E9E9;text-align:left;vertical-align:top;" |Party
! style="background-color:#E9E9E9;text-align:right;" |Votes
! style="background-color:#E9E9E9;text-align:right;" |%
|-
|style="background-color:"|
|align=left|Nikolay Kolomeytsev (incumbent)
|align=left|Communist Party
|
|44.19%
|-
|style="background-color:"|
|align=left|Yury Vertiy
|align=left|Independent
|
|27.83%
|-
|style="background-color:#FF4400"|
|align=left|Konstantin Denisenko
|align=left|Andrei Nikolayev and Svyatoslav Fyodorov Bloc
|
|5.30%
|-
|style="background-color:#084284"|
|align=left|Eduard Kaporikov
|align=left|Spiritual Heritage
|
|2.14%
|-
|style="background-color:#000000"|
|colspan=2 |against all
|
|18.20%
|-
| colspan="5" style="background-color:#E9E9E9;"|
|- style="font-weight:bold"
| colspan="3" style="text-align:left;" | Total
| 
| 100%
|-
| colspan="5" style="background-color:#E9E9E9;"|
|- style="font-weight:bold"
| colspan="4" |Source:
|
|}

2003

|-
! colspan=2 style="background-color:#E9E9E9;text-align:left;vertical-align:top;" |Candidate
! style="background-color:#E9E9E9;text-align:left;vertical-align:top;" |Party
! style="background-color:#E9E9E9;text-align:right;" |Votes
! style="background-color:#E9E9E9;text-align:right;" |%
|-
|style="background-color:"|
|align=left|Zoya Stepanova
|align=left|Independent
|
|32.09%
|-
|style="background-color:"|
|align=left|Nikolay Kolomeytsev (incumbent)
|align=left|Communist Party
|
|30.82%
|-
|style="background-color:"|
|align=left|Vladimir Shcherbakov
|align=left|Independent
|
|19.31%
|-
|style="background-color:"|
|align=left|Viktor Alekhin
|align=left|Independent
|
|2.73%
|-
|style="background-color:#000000"|
|colspan=2 |against all
|
|12.34%
|-
| colspan="5" style="background-color:#E9E9E9;"|
|- style="font-weight:bold"
| colspan="3" style="text-align:left;" | Total
| 
| 100%
|-
| colspan="5" style="background-color:#E9E9E9;"|
|- style="font-weight:bold"
| colspan="4" |Source:
|
|}

2016

|-
! colspan=2 style="background-color:#E9E9E9;text-align:left;vertical-align:top;" |Candidate
! style="background-color:#E9E9E9;text-align:leftt;vertical-align:top;" |Party
! style="background-color:#E9E9E9;text-align:right;" |Votes
! style="background-color:#E9E9E9;text-align:right;" |%
|-
| style="background-color:"|
|align=left|Mikhail Chernyshyov
|align=left|United Russia
|
|48.59%
|-
|style="background-color:"|
|align=left|Vladimir Bessonov
|align=left|Communist Party
|
|18.62%
|-
|style="background-color:"|
|align=left|Yegor Kolesnikov
|align=left|Liberal Democratic Party
|
|9.92%
|-
|style="background-color:"|
|align=left|Gennady Zubov
|align=left|Rodina
|
|5.26%
|-
| style="background-color: " |
|align=left|Aleksey Lyashchenko
|align=left|A Just Russia
|
|4.86%
|-
|style="background-color:"|
|align=left|Andrey Kutyrev
|align=left|Independent
|
|2.35%
|-
|style="background-color:"|
|align=left|Vakhtang Kozayev
|align=left|Communists of Russia
|
|1.81%
|-
|style="background-color: " |
|align=left|Vladimir Ignatkin
|align=left|Yabloko
|
|1.73%
|-
|style="background-color:"|
|align=left|Vladimir Bazarov
|align=left|Patriots of Russia
|
|1.45%
|-
|style="background-color:"|
|align=left|Tatyana Cherepanova
|align=left|Civic Platform
|
|1.41%
|-
|style="background:"| 
|align=left|Stanislav Avramenko
|align=left|People's Freedom Party
|
|1.37%
|-
| colspan="5" style="background-color:#E9E9E9;"|
|- style="font-weight:bold"
| colspan="3" style="text-align:left;" | Total
| 
| 100%
|-
| colspan="5" style="background-color:#E9E9E9;"|
|- style="font-weight:bold"
| colspan="4" |Source:
|
|}

2021

|-
! colspan=2 style="background-color:#E9E9E9;text-align:left;vertical-align:top;" |Candidate
! style="background-color:#E9E9E9;text-align:left;vertical-align:top;" |Party
! style="background-color:#E9E9E9;text-align:right;" |Votes
! style="background-color:#E9E9E9;text-align:right;" |%
|-
| style="background-color:"|
|align=left|Vitaly Kushnarev
|align=left|United Russia
|
|37.08%
|-
|style="background-color:"|
|align=left|Andrey Kutyrev
|align=left|Communist Party
|
|26.26%
|-
|style="background-color:"|
|align=left|Aleksandr Khurudzhi
|align=left|New People
|
|11.24%
|-
|style="background-color:"|
|align=left|Boris Valter
|align=left|A Just Russia — For Truth
|
|9.75%
|-
|style="background-color:"|
|align=left|Denis Karasev
|align=left|Liberal Democratic Party
|
|7.40%
|-
|style="background-color:"|
|align=left|Nikolay Larin
|align=left|The Greens
|
|2.92%
|-
|style="background-color:"|
|align=left|Kirill Surenko
|align=left|Party of Growth
|
|1.56%
|-
| colspan="5" style="background-color:#E9E9E9;"|
|- style="font-weight:bold"
| colspan="3" style="text-align:left;" | Total
| 
| 100%
|-
| colspan="5" style="background-color:#E9E9E9;"|
|- style="font-weight:bold"
| colspan="4" |Source:
|
|}

Notes

References

Russian legislative constituencies
Politics of Rostov Oblast